Paola Andreína Ramírez Gómez (26 July 199319 April 2017) was a Venezuelan student from the Catholic University of Tachira killed during the 2017 Venezuelan protests.

Killing 
On 19 April 2017, Paola was nearby the Las Palomas Square in the San Carlos neighborhood in San Cristóbal, Táchira state, when she was intercepted by several armed civilians on motorcycles that were patrolling the area due to the demonstrations that were taking place in the zone. They tried to strip her of her belongings, and when she ran away she was hit by a projectile that pierced her lungs.

On 21 April, during her funeral, her parents were taken by the CICPC forensic police and interrogated following their comments that she had called them minutes before her death, stating that colectivos were pursuing her. Their testimony contrasted Interior Minister Néstor Reverol's statement, who said that a member of an opposition party killed Ramírez.

Ramírez's death was documented in a report by a panel of independent experts from the Organization of American States, considering that it could constitute a crime against humanity committed in Venezuela along with other killings during the protests.

See also 
 Crisis in Venezuela
 Armando Cañizales
 Miguel Castillo
 Neomar Lander
 Paúl Moreno
 Jairo Ortiz
 Juan Pablo Pernalete
 Xiomara Scott
 Fabián Urbina
 David Vallenilla
 Timeline of the 2017 Venezuelan protests

References 

1993 births
2017 deaths
Deaths by firearm in Venezuela
Deaths by person in Venezuela
Female murder victims
Filmed killings
People murdered in Venezuela
2017 Venezuelan protests
Violence against women in Venezuela
2017 murders in Venezuela
History of women in Venezuela